Constellation Me is the debut studio album by British singer/songwriter and musician Joe Brooks, released on 7 September 2010 on the label Lava Records/Universal Republic Records in the United States. Constellation Me is the first major label release by Brooks and his third music release overall.

Background
Constellation Me began production in 2009 when Brooks signed to Jason Flom's Lava Records and Universal Republic Records. Production and recording for the album took place in Los Angeles, California and Stockholm, Sweden with a handful of producers and used material that Brooks had been working on for the past few years. The album's single, "Superman", was a song that had proven popular on Brooks's Myspace page. The "Superman" music video filmed on 27 May 2010 and featured Giglianne Braga as the female lead, who was currently on the "If I Can Dream" reality show. Memorabilia from the "Superman" shoot would later be raffled off as part of the funding/promotion for Brooks's next album, A Reason To Swim.

Constellation Me was released on 7 September 2010. Promotion for the album was brief, but included Brooks making his first national television appearance on Fox5 News in San Diego and later on SanDiego6. Tracks from the album saw commercial use, with "These Broken Hands of Mine" being featured on the show Grey's Anatomy and "Superman" on the movie Step Up 3D. The album was not a commercial success and Brooks was dropped by Lava/Universal Republic.

Track listing

Personnel

Musicians
 Joe Brooks: Vocals, Acoustic Guitar (all tracks)
 Fredrick Bokkenheuser: Drums
 Jason Borger: Keyboards
 Rune Westberg: Additional Guitars, Bass, Percussion, Programming
 Stuart Brawley: Piano, Organ, Keyboards
 Victor Indrizzo: Drums, Percussion
 Carl Falk: Keyboards, Programming, Additional Guitars, Backing Vocals
 Ilya Toshinsky: Additional Guitars
 Carl Bjorsell: Backing Vocals
 Mikal Blue: Bass
 Martin Bylund: Violin
 Mattias Johansson: Violin
 Irene Bylund: Viola
 David Bukovinszky: Cello
 Joe Corcoran: Electric Guitars, Bass, Horns, Percussion
 Jason Borger: Organ
 Joacim Otterbjork: Bass

Production
 Rune Westberg: Producer, Engineer, Mixer
 Carl Falk: Producer, Engineer
 Carl Bjorsell: Producer, Engineer
 Mark Endert: Mixer
 Stuart Brawley: Producer, Engineer, Programmer, Mixer
 Management: Ken Krongard
 Doug Mark: Legal
 Pamela Littky: Photography
 Joe Spix: Art, Direction

References

2010 debut albums
Joe Brooks (singer) albums